Thomas Grimley (1821–1871) was an Irish-born priest and educator who served as Bishop of Cape Town, South Africa.

Grimley was born in Skerries, Dublin, in 1821. He was ordained in 1846 by Archbishop Paul Cullen and then worked as a curate at St Paul's, Arran Quay, Dublin.

In 1860 Grimley was ordained Titular Bishop of Antigonea and co-adjutor Bishop of Cape Town. In 1862 Vicar Apostolic of Cape of Good Hope, Western District, South Africa, succeeding Patrick Raymond Griffith OP, as bishop.

Grimley established many schools and churches in South Africa. The first school for the deaf was established in 1863 by the Irish Dominican order and Grimley and was known as the Dominican Grimley Institute for the Deaf.

Grimley attended the First Vatican Council in 1869.

He died in 1871. He was succeeded by another Irishman, John Leonard.

References
 

1821 births
1871 deaths
19th-century Roman Catholic bishops in South Africa
People from Skerries, Dublin
Christian clergy from Dublin (city)
Irish expatriate Catholic bishops
Roman Catholic bishops of Cape Town